Yeh Jawani Ta Ra Ri Ri is an Indian television series that premiered on 16 May 2014 on Channel V India. Ye Jawani Ta Ra Ri Ri is a story of three brothers and their journey of discovering their adulthood. The story telecast the common problems faced by young men and how they get in a relationship.

Cast
  Chirag Mahbubani as Aditya Khosla 
 Shritama Mukherjee as Kimaya 
 Anshuman Malhotra as Ishaan Khosla
 Shrishti Ganguly Rindani as Gattu
 Mohit Tolani as Siddharth Khosla 
 Pooja Bhamrah as Devika

References

External links
Official Website on Hotstar

2014 Indian television series debuts
Channel V India original programming
Indian teen drama television series
2014 Indian television series endings